Cudonia confusa, commonly known as the cinnamon jellybaby, is a species of fungus in the family Cudoniaceae. The species was first described scientifically in 1898 by Italian mycologist Giacomo Bresadola.

Description
Its cylindrical spores measure 35–45 by 2 µm; arranged in a parallel fashion, they are borne in asci that measure 105–120 by 10–12 µm. The paraphyses are curled at their tips.

Cudonia circinans is similar in appearance, but its stalk is not the same color as its head.

Habitat and distribution
Cudonia confusa is found in Asia (China and Korea) and Europe, where it usually grows in tufts in coniferous forests.

References

External links

Leotiomycetes
Fungi described in 1898
Fungi of Europe
Fungi of Asia